Knysna Commando was a light infantry regiment of the South African Army. It formed part of the South African Army Infantry Formation as well as the South African Territorial Reserve.

History

Origin
Found at Kynsna around 1934. Members were issued originally with .303 rifles and used for area force protection such as search and cordons as well as stock theft control and police assistance.

Operations

With the SADF
During 1978 a rifle range was built on ground ceded by the Department of Forestry.

This unit resorted under the command of Group 4 at Oudsthoorn with Southern Cape Command up to 1986. The Group was subsequently transferred to Western Cape Command. The unit received its national colours at the Castle of Good Hope 14 September 1993.

With the SANDF

Amalgamation
Outeniqua Commando was amalgamated with Knysna Commando and was renamed Garden Route Commando by June 1997.

Disbandment
This unit, along with all other Commando units was disbanded after a decision by South African President Thabo Mbeki to disband all Commando Units. The Commando system was phased out between 2003 and 2008 "because of the role it played in the apartheid era", according to the Minister of Safety and Security Charles Nqakula.

On 21 April 2003, this Commando laid up its colours at the Albatross Shellhole  in Knysna for safekeeping.

Unit Insignia

Leadership

References

See also 
 South African Commando System

Infantry regiments of South Africa
South African Commando Units